Phellodermidae is a family of sponges belonging to the order Poecilosclerida, first described by Rob van Soest and Eduardo Hajdu in 2002.

Genera:
 Echinostylinos Topsent, 1927
 Phelloderma Ridley & Dendy, 1886

References

Sponge families
Animals described in 2002
Taxa named by Rob van Soest